Jhalak Dikhhla Jaa 3 is the third season of the dance reality show, Jhalak Dikhhla Jaa. It premiered on 27 February 2009 on Sony TV. The series was hosted by Shweta Tiwari, Shiv Panditt and Rohit Roy. The series was won by Baichung Bhutia and Sonia Zaffer on 31 May 2009.

Judges
 Saroj Khan
 Vaibhavi Merchant
 Juhi Chawla

Contestants

External links
 Jhalak Dikhhla Jaa Official website

Jhalak Dikhhla Jaa seasons
2009 Indian television seasons
Sony Entertainment Television original programming

pl:Jhalak Dikhhla Jaa